Flying Officer George Ernest Goodman  (8 October 1920 – 14 June 1941), sometimes known as Randy or Benny Goodman, was a Royal Air Force flying ace of the Second World War who flew in the Battle of Britain as one of "The Few". Goodman is credited with 10 individual kills and six shared.

Early life 
Goodman was born in Haifa on 8 October 1920 to a British father, Sidney Charles Goodman, and Bida Lerner from Zikhron Ya'akov. He had two sisters, Winifred and Ellen. His parents were married in St Lukes Church in Haifa, circa 1920.. 
Goodman was sent to the United Kingdom to be educated at Highgate School in London. He was a member of the Officer Training Corps whilst at school. His parents left Haifa in 1939 when his father was transferred to Lagos, Nigeria as a British civil servant with the Nigerian Railway.

Royal Air Force 
Goodman joined the Royal Air Force in 1939 and was granted a short service (six-year) commission on 2 September 1939 with the rank of Acting Pilot Officer.

He undertook Elementary & Reserve Flying Training and then attended Flying Training School, where he converted to the Hawker Hurricane. On 27 February 1940, he was assigned to No. 11 Group Pool 11 and then went to an Operational Training Unit.

Battle of France 
On 1 May 1940, Goodman was assigned to No. 1 Squadron RAF and joined the squadron in the Battle of France.

He was credited with his first kill on 13 May 1940, a Heinkel He 111; he shared a Messerschmitt Bf 110 the same day. He also shared an He 111 on 14 May 1940 and was credited with one final kill, an He 111, on 17 June 1940 before No. 1 Squadron left France.

He was confirmed as a Pilot Officer on 10 July 1940.

Battle of Britain 
Compared to many who flew during the Battle of Britain, Goodman was a relatively experienced pilot because he had flown combat in the Battle of France.

He was credited with a Messerschmitt Bf 109 of III./JG 27 on 25 July 1940, believed to be Oberstleutenant Kirschstein, who was killed. On 11 August, he shared a Bf 110 destroyed. He was credited with a KG 55 He 111 on 16 August, a Bf 110 of ZG 26 and shared a Dornier Do 17 of KG 76 on 18 August. On 6 September, he was credited with a Bf 110; however, he was shot down during this action and forced to bail out, injuring his shoulder in the process. His plane crashed at Brownings Farm, Chiddingstone Causeway.

He returned to operations shortly afterwards, and on 8 October 1940, he shared a Junkers Ju 88 damaged and was credited with a Do 17 shared damaged on 27 October.

Distinguished Flying Cross 
Goodman was awarded the Distinguished Flying Cross for meritorious service during the Battle of Britain, which was gazetted on 26 November 1940. The citation reads:
Pilot Officer George Ernest Goodman (42598) — No. 1 Squadron.
"This officer has performed outstanding work in all his engagements against the enemy. In October, 1940, he assisted in the destruction of an enemy bomber which was attacking an aerodrome in the failing light at dusk. His courage and resourcefulness have enabled him to destroy at least six enemy aircraft."

Western Desert 
In November 1940, Goodman was assigned to No. 73 Squadron RAF, which was to fly to the Western Desert. En route to the Middle East, he stopped in Lagos and saw his mother; as the squadron flew out, they performed a barrel roll over the Goodman home.

On 4 February 1941, Goodman was credited with shooting down a German Bf 110 of III./ZG 26 at Tobruk and a Fiat CR.42 on Barce. The pilot of the Italian fighter – who was killed –  was Capitano Guglielmo Chiarini, an ace from 366ª Squadriglia, 151º Gruppo, 53º Stormo Caccia Terrestre, who flew Savoia-Marchetti S.79 bombers in Spanish Civil War, and had been awarded several times by Italy and Spain too.

Goodman was promoted to Flying Officer on 28 February 1941.

On 9 April 1941, he was shot down again, either by ground fire or the Bf 110 of 7./ZG 26 piloted by Oblt. Georg Christl and crashed; luckily this was behind the British lines.

On 14 April, Goodman shared a Henschel Hs 126, and on 21 April, destroyed a Junkers Ju 87 and shared another. In late April 1941, he was granted a period of leave and visited his sisters in Haifa.

Death 
He was shot down and killed by flak while strafing Gazala airfield on 14 June 1941. His aircraft crashed at Kambut.

Goodman is buried in the Knightsbridge War Cemetery, Acroma, Libya (grave 10.C.21).

Controversy surrounding nationality 
Due to the confusion with the more modern usage of Palestinian, in the 1960s film Battle of Britain, Goodman is credited as a pilot from Israel, although the State of Israel was not proclaimed until 1948. Haifa, at the time of his birth, was part of the former Ottoman Empire administered by the British military. On 24 July 1922, the League of Nations commission on the administration of the former Ottoman territories granted Britain administration of the former southern part of Ottoman Syria, formally creating the British Mandate for Palestine.

Goodman was a British subject.

References

External links 
 
 
 

1920 births
1941 deaths
Royal Air Force officers
British World War II flying aces
The Few
Recipients of the Distinguished Flying Cross (United Kingdom)
People educated at Highgate School
British people of Jewish descent
Royal Air Force personnel killed in World War II
Aviators killed by being shot down
Royal Air Force pilots of World War II
Burials at Knightsbridge War Cemetery
British expatriates in Mandatory Palestine
People from Haifa